UPES is a private university in Dehradun, made up of the School of Advanced Engineering, the School of Computer Science, the School of Design, the School of Law, the School of Business, the School of Health Sciences & Technology, the School of Modern Media and the School of Liberal Studies.

Established through the UPES Act, 2003 of the State Legislature of Uttarakhand, UPES is one of the top ranked, UGC-recognized, private university. The university was recently ranked 243 in Asia and the 3rd best private university in India by the QS World Rankings 2023. The National Institutional Ranking Framework (NIRF), Ministry of Education, has ranked UPES as the 65th top University. Besides, it’s School of Engineering was ranked 61st, School of Business 41st and School of Law 21st in India. UPES has also been accredited by NAAC with an accreditation grade ‘A’ and has received 5-Stars on Employability (placements), by globally acclaimed QS Rating, with 90%+ placements over the last few years.

UPES offers graduate and postgraduate programs through its eight schools: School of Advanced Engineering, School of Computer Science, School of Design, School of Law, School of Business, School of Health Sciences & Technology, School of Modern Media and School of Liberal Studies with about 13,000 students and 1500+ faculty and staff members.

See also 
 Dehradun

References

UPES
Law schools in India
Universities and colleges in Dehradun
Science and technology in Dehradun
Petroleum engineering schools
Institutions of Petroleum in India
Educational institutions established in 2003
2003 establishments in Uttarakhand